Hope Channel Philippines is a religious network of the Seventh-day Adventist Church in the Philippines. Its TV stations are owned by Gateway UHF Television Broadcasting, while its radio stations are owned by Digital Broadcasting Corporation. Founded and launched on September 26, 2010, in the South Philippines (its main service broadcast provider), and in January 2011 in Luzon and Visayas. It was first seen on UHF Channel 25 in Cagayan de Oro in the Northern Mindanao region.

In Luzon, this station aired from 5am-12 midnight on UHF Channel 45, Manila, but it became a full-time station in mid-2017 after Gateway UHF Broadcasting quietly ended their ties with 3ABN. The network programming is similar to Hope Channel International programming but in Filipino language.

History
Gateway UHF TV was formed in 1992 when it was granted a legislative franchise to operate television stations on the UHF band under Republic Act 7223.

On June 1, 2001, Gateway UHF TV began its operations on UHF 45 in Metro Manila, carrying HopeTV of the Seventh-Day Adventist Church (SDA). In 2011, with the arrival of global Christian lifestyle network Hope Channel in the Philippines, the SDA acquired Gateway UHF Television Broadcasting. In 2015, the company began broadcasting on digital terrestrial television.

In 2018, Gateway UHF TV's broadcast franchise was renewed.

Hope Channel stations

Analog Stations

Digital Stations

Digital television

Digital channels

Digital Affiliates

Hope Radio stations

FM Stations

AM Stations

See also

 Hope Channel
 Seventh-day Adventist Church
 Media ministries of the Seventh-day Adventist Church

References

External links
 Hope Channel PHL official website

 

Christian mass media companies
Christian television networks
Television networks in the Philippines
Television channels and stations established in 2010
Companies based in Davao City
Companies based in Pasig
Seventh-day Adventist media
Religious television stations in the Philippines